Charlotte Abramow (born 30 September 1993 in Brussels) is a Belgian photographer and filmmaker.

Biography 
Charlotte Abramow was born in Brussels and made her first pictures around the age of 7. At the age of 16, she was spotted by photographer Paolo Roversi, during an internship at the 2010 Rencontres d'Arles. In 2011, Roversi wrote an article about her photos, "The fragility and soul of a warrior", published in Polka Magazine. In 2013, she joined the Gobelins School in Paris, and graduated in 2015. Her photographic work combines seriousness and absurdity.

In 2017, she started making the video for the song La Loi de Murphy and Je veux tes yeux by Angèle. In 2018, she created a video clip for International Women's Day, using the song Les Passantes by Georges Brassens, based on an idea by Christophe Coffre, president of Havas. The metaphorical depiction of vulvae and menstruation in this clip leads a YouTube ban, for under-18. This classification was later removed after protests from users.

She is working on a photographic project around her father, Maurice, who survived cancer.

Photographic works 

 2014:  The Real Boobs (puis dans le cadre de la Nuit de l'année aux Rencontres d'Arles 2015)
 2015: Metamorphosis (en collaboration avec le plasticien végétal Duy Anh Nhan Duc)
 2015: Bleu (Exhibition Magazine)
 2016: Dear Mother
 2017: They Love Trampoline
 2017: Angèle (pochette d'album)
 2017: Un spectacle drôle, spectacle de l’humoriste Marina Rollman (également direction artistique)
 création en cours: Maurice
 création en cours: First Loves (en collaboration avec Claire Laffut)
 en projet: Find Your Clitoris

Filmography 

 2017: La Loi de Murphy d'Angèle
 2018: Je veux tes yeux d'Angèle
 2018: Les Passantes de Georges Brassens (clip pour la Journée internationale des femmes)

Awards 

 Weekend Photo Awards 2011: prix du public
 Prix Picto de la jeune photographie de mode 2013: finaliste
 Prix Picto de la jeune photographie de mode 2014: 1er prix
 Rencontres d'Arles 2015: finaliste des Photo Folio Review Awards
 Rencontres d'Arles 2017: mention Spéciale pour Projet Maurice aux Photo Folio Review Awards

References

External links 
 
 Projet Maurice, project site photographic of Charlotte Abramow

Living people
1993 births
Music video directors
Belgian women photographers
Photographers from Brussels
Fashion photographers
Belgian women film directors